Bridge to Silence is a 1989 American TV movie starring Lee Remick and Marlee Matlin. It was one of Remick's final performances.

Remick called Matlin " a wonderful actress. She's so open and kind of instinctive and free . . . curious. It was an interesting experience, which I had some concern about. When I started I thought, you know, what's it going to be like for the two of us to communicate? I do not have sign language at my beck and call. But we did. It was terrific."

The movie was filmed in Toronto and directed by Karen Arthur. It was the first time Remick had worked with a female director. "Interesting working with a woman," she said. "Not that it's different in terms of her work, she's doing the same thing as men do, but I've just never been in that position. Directors have always been kind of father figures. It's interesting. It's wonderful. She's terrific."

References

External links

Review at Los Angeles Times

1989 television films
1989 films
1980s English-language films
American Sign Language films
American drama television films
Films directed by Karen Arthur
1980s American films